Ectemnius scaber is a species of square-headed wasp in the family Crabronidae. It is found in North America.

Subspecies
These two subspecies belong to the species Ectemnius scaber:
 Ectemnius scaber rufescens Krombein, 1954
 Ectemnius scaber scaber (Lepeletier de Saint Fargeau & Brullé, 1835)

References

Crabronidae
Articles created by Qbugbot
Insects described in 1835